Marktredwitz station is the station of the major district town of Marktredwitz in the Bavarian administrative region of Upper Franconia. Two main lines, the Nuremberg–Cheb railway and the Weiden–Oberkotzau railway, cross at the station. It is classified by Deutsche Bahn as a category 3 station and has five platform tracks.

Marktredwitz station—still called Markt Redwitz at the opening of the station—is an important railway hub in Northern Bavaria. It is located in the northwest of the town and is about a five-minute walk from the town centre.

In the station forecourt is the central bus station, where buses connect Marktredwitz with the surrounding area. The bus station is also the stopping point of the Bavaria–Berlin Express (BEX). At the station there is a hotel, a major site of Deutsche Post, a medical centre and the headquarters of the Scherdel Group, a leading manufacturer of machinery parts.

History
The station was opened on 15 May 1878 by the Royal Bavarian State Railways as a through station along with the Schnabelwaid–Marktredwitz line (now part of the Nuremberg–Cheb line) and the Marktredwitz–Holenbrunn line (now part of the Regensburg–Hof line). The station became a junction with the commissioning of the branch to Schirnding (later extended to Cheb, then called Eger; the whole line is now part of the Nuremberg–Cheb line) on 20 November 1879 and the link from Wiesau (now a section of the Regensburg–Hof line) on 1 June 1882.

Before World War II, Marktredwitz was an important railway hub for the whole of Europe. The Rome–Munich–Berlin–Stockholm and the Paris–Nuremberg–Prague routes crossed there. 100 trains daily left the station in the four different directions. Even during the fall of the Berlin Wall, Marktredwitzer station played a crucial role. For many East Germans, the stop at the station was the first opportunity to leave the crowded trains, which crossed the border at Hof or near Cheb.

Until 2006, Marktredwitz was a stop on the Nuremberg–Dresden-Hof Intercity route. Since that service ended, Marktredwitz has been served by the Franken-Sachsen-Express (FSX).

Infrastructure 
The once extensive system of tracks has been reduced in recent years. In freight transport, the station is an important transhipment point for intermodal transport  for Northern Bavaria. Five platform tracks are available for passengers. In the station building there is a bookstore, a bakery and a Deutsche Bahn travel center with ticket machines and a waiting area. The station is partly barrier-free but access to tracks 2 and 3 is by stairs only.

An electronic interlocking is responsible for controlling the station itself and the operating points of Holenbrunn, Kirchenlamitz, Marktleuthen, Martinlamitz, Neusorg, Pechbrunn, Röslau and Waldershof.

Rail services

The station has lost its importance for long-distance services, but still forms a central interchange for northern Bavaria, Saxony and western Bohemia. It is operated by Deutsche Bahn with Regional-Express services as well as services operated by Regentalbahn and its subsidiary Die Länderbahn, including its Alex service.

Direct connections are available to Cheb, Hof, Munich, Nuremberg, Regensburg, Schwandorf and Weiden.

Notes

External links

Railway stations in Bavaria
Railway stations in Germany opened in 1878
Buildings and structures in Wunsiedel (district)